Xiage may refer to the following locations in China:

 Xiage, Chaohu (夏阁镇), town in Anhui
 Xiage, Zhao'an County (霞葛镇), town in Zhao'an County, Fujian
 Xiage, Xianju County (下各镇), town in Xianju County, Zhejiang